La part du diable is the thirteenth studio album by Polish thrash metal band Acid Drinkers. It was released on 17 October 2012 through Mystic Production. It is the first album to feature Wojciech "Jankiel" Moryto.

The album was recorded at the Perlazza studio in Opalenica. This studio belongs to ex-band member Przemysław "Perła" Wejmann. It was mixed at Chimp Studio by Jacek Miłaszewski. The cover art was created by Aleksandra Spanowicz.

Track listing

Personnel 
 Band
 Tomasz "Titus" Pukacki – vocals, bass
 Wojciech "Jankiel" Moryto – guitar, backing vocals, lead vocals (on tracks 5, 11)
 Dariusz "Popcorn" Popowicz – guitar, backing vocals,
 Maciej "Ślimak" Starosta – drums, backing vocals, production
 Additional musicians
 Michał "Mihau" Kaleciński – bass (on tracks 8, 11)
 Additional personnel
 Przemysław "Perła" Wejmann – engineering
 Jacek Miłaszewski – mixing
 Aleksandra Spanowicz – cover art
 Łukasz "Pachu" Pach – album graphics

External links 
 
 Album on the official Mystic Production website 

Acid Drinkers albums
2012 albums
Mystic Production albums